The Azerbaijan Basketball Federation (Azerbaijani: Azərbaycan Basketbol Federasiyası), also known as ABF, is the national governing body of basketball in Azerbaijan. It was founded in 1992, and are headquartered in Baku.

The Azerbaijan Basketball Federation operates the Azerbaijan men's national team and Azerbaijan women's national team. They organize national competitions in Azerbaijan, for both the men's and women's senior teams and also the youth national basketball teams. 

The top professional league in Azerbaijan is the Azerbaijan Basketball League.

See also
Azerbaijan men's national basketball team
Azerbaijan men's national under-20 basketball team
Azerbaijan men's national under-18 basketball team
Azerbaijan men's national under-16 basketball team
Azerbaijan women's national basketball team

References

External links
Official website 
Azerbaijan at FIBA site

Basketball
Fed
Basketball governing bodies in Europe
Sports organizations established in 1992
Sport in Baku